Salvia japonica, known as East Asian sage, is an annual plant that is native to several provinces in China and Taiwan, growing at  elevation.

There are two named varieties, with slight variations in leaf and flower shape: S. japonica var. japonica and S.  japonica var. multifoliolata

References

External links
 

japonica
Flora of China